Sampleville (also Kitsom Corners, Kitson Corner) is an unincorporated community in Preble County, Ohio, United States.

Notes

Unincorporated communities in Preble County, Ohio
Unincorporated communities in Ohio